Riders of the Sage is a 1939 American Western film produced and directed by Harry S. Webb starring Bob Steele. The film is a remake of Ridin' Law (1930) and Rusty Rides Alone (1933).

Plot
Bob Burke comes to Apache Basin to visit his old friend Tom Martin. He finds himself in the middle of a range war between sheepherders led by the Halsey family and the cattlemen including the Martin family.  The Halseys are holding Tom Martin prisoner in order to gain the Martin ranch. Further complications ensue when Mona Halsey is in love with the Robin Hood type Poe Powers who leads a gang of merry men known as the Riders of the Sage. Halsey finds himself smack in the middle of a three way fight.

Cast 
Bob Steele as Bob Burke
Claire Rochelle as Mona Halsey
Ralph Hoopes as Buddy Martin
Jimmy Aubrey as Steve Reynolds
Carleton Young as Luke Halsey
Earl Douglas as Hank Halsey
Ted Adams as Poe Powers
Dave O'Brien as Tom Martin
Frank LaRue as Jim Martin
Bruce Dane as Rusty, the Singer
Jerry Sheldon as Herb
Reed Howes as Sam Halsey
Bud Osborne as Sheriff

See also
Bob Steele filmography

Notes

External links 

1939 films
American Western (genre) films
1930s English-language films
American black-and-white films
1939 Western (genre) films
Films directed by Harry S. Webb
Remakes of American films
1930s American films